Miechocin (Latin: Miechovia) is the oldest part of today's town of Tarnobrzeg, Poland. Its first settlement dates around 1000 AD, while first documented mention of Miechocin comes from the year 1185, when wooden church of Mary Magdalene parish church was established here. Original wooden church was replaced with a brick one in 1340. In 1613, the church was expanded and remodelled in Baroque style. Until 1922, the church at Miechocin was the seat of a large parish, also which covered the area from Wielowies to Kolbuszowa, together with Tarnobrzeg. In the 16th century, a parish school with a library was opened here, which became widely known as the Miechocin Academy. The village was famous for its potmakers, whose products were sold as far as Gdańsk, Elbląg and Toruń.

References 
 

Districts of Tarnobrzeg